Crex may refer to:

 Crex, a monotypic genus of birds in the rail family, the corn crake
 CREX, a trading name of Citicorp Railmark Inc. (Citirail)